Louisa Anne Meredith (20 July 1812 – 21 October 1895), also known as Louisa Anne Twamley, was an Anglo/Australian writer, illustrator and possibly one of Australia's earliest photographers.

Biography
Louisa Anne Twamley was born in Birmingham, England, the daughter of Thomas Twamley and Louisa Ann née Meredith. She was educated mainly by her mother, and in 1835 published a volume, Poems, which was reviewed favourably. This was followed by The Romance of Nature (1836, third edition 1839), mostly in verse. Another volume was published in 1839, subtitled An autumn ramble on the Wye an account of a tour on the River Wye from Chepstow to near its source at Plynlimon.

On 18 April 1839, she married her cousin, Charles Meredith at Old Edgbaston Church, Birmingham. Charles had emigrated to Van Diemen's Land (now Tasmania) in 1821 with his father George and family.  They had been pioneers of grazing, whaling and other activities around Swansea on Tasmania's East Coast. Charles had become a squatter in the Canberra district of New South Wales.

Emigration to Australia 
Meredith and her husband sailed for New South Wales in June 1839, and arrived at Sydney on 27 September 1839. After travelling into the interior as far as Bathurst, Mrs Meredith returned to the coast and lived at Homebush for around a year. By the time of his return to New South Wales, severe economic depression caused by excessive land speculation had destroyed the value of Charles' property, and towards the end of 1840 they relocated to Tasmania. An interesting account of her first 11 years in Australia is given in her two books, Notes and Sketches of New South Wales (1844), reprinted at least twice, and My Home in Tasmania (1852), which was soon republished in the United States under the title Nine Years in Australia."

For most of her life Louisa Meredith lived on properties around Swansea. In 1860 she published Some of My Bush Friends in Tasmania which contained elaborate full-colour plates printed by the new chromolithography process. The illustrations were drawn by herself, and simple descriptions of characteristic native flowers were given. In 1861 an account of a visit to Victoria in 1856, Over the Straits, was published, and in 1880 Tasmanian Friends and Foes, Feathered, Furred and Finned. This went into a second edition in 1881. In 1891, Meredith went to London to supervise the publication of Last Series, Bush Friends in Tasmania. Published at the beginning of a severe financial depression in the Australian colonies, this project and the collapse of the bank where most of her savings were held ruined her financially. In her final years Meredith suffered from chronic sciatica and became blind in one eye. She died in Collingwood, Victoria (a suburb of Melbourne) on 21 October 1895, and was buried at Melbourne General Cemetery in Carlton North, Victoria.

Meredith was the author of two novels, Phoebe's Mother (1869), which had appeared in the Melbourne weekly The Australasian in 1866 under the title of Ebba, and Nellie, or Seeking Goodly Pearls (1882).

Many of her books were illustrated by herself. Her volumes on New South Wales, Tasmania, and Victoria in the 1840s and 1850s, will always retain their historical significance.

Commentator and activist 
Meredith took great interest in politics, her husband Charles being a Member of the Tasmanian Legislative Council for several terms between the mid-1850s until just before his death in 1881.  She was an early member of the Society for the Prevention of Cruelty to Animals and influenced her husband to legislate for preservation of native wildlife and scenery.

Meredith often wrote unsigned articles for the Tasmanian press. This was no new thing for her as in her youth she had written articles in support of the Chartists. When she visited Sydney in 1882, Sir Henry Parkes told her that he had read and appreciated her articles when a youth. After her husband's death she was granted a pension of £100 a year by the Tasmanian government.

Photographer 
Hall and Mather suggest that Meredith, nine years her senior, may have preceded Louisa Elizabeth How as the first woman photographer in Australia. Vivienne Rae-Ellis cites a note in Meredith's 1861 Over the Straits, that photographs she made documenting her travels in Victoria in the 1850s were copied for the drawings, alongside her freehand sketches, reproduced for engravings that illustrate the book, as was usual in days before photomechanical reproduction. Meredith noted in her 1839 diary a daguerreotype demonstration in Hobart and was certainly interested in the medium. She was a friend of Tasmanian John Watt Beattie in the 1880s and he records her giving him assistance as a photographer, and of her showing him the "many specimens of both her own and the Bishop Nixon's photographic work in those early days of the very black art," and that she had been "instrumental in having the last remnant of the Tasmanian Aboriginals photographed for the purposes of science." However, though these are records of her making them, not one of Meredith's photographs survives.

References

External links

Photos of Louisa Anne Meredith at The McCullagh Collection.
Photos and images of Louisa Anne Meredith at the State Library of Tasmania.
Illustrations by Louisa Anne Meredith at the 'Transplanted' exhibition at the State Library of Tasmania.
Vivienne Rae-Ellis, "Louisa Anne Meredith: Tigress in Exile," Blubberhead Press, Hobart, 1979
Works by Louisa Anne Meredith at Project Gutenberg Australia

English women poets
English memoirists
English travel writers
British women travel writers
English women novelists
19th-century Australian novelists
Australian women poets
Australian memoirists
Australian travel writers
Australian women novelists
Botanical illustrators
Writers who illustrated their own writing
1812 births
1895 deaths
Writers from Tasmania
Australian women memoirists
19th-century English poets
19th-century British painters
19th-century English women writers
19th-century British writers
19th-century Australian painters
19th-century Australian women writers
English women non-fiction writers
Australian women photographers
19th-century memoirists